River Forest Public Schools District 90 is a school district headquartered in River Forest, Illinois in the suburbs of Chicago.

There are three schools in the district: Lincoln Elementary School, Willard Elementary School, and Roosevelt Middle School. Students matriculate to Oak Park and River Forest High School.

References

External links
 River Forest Public Schools

School districts in Cook County, Illinois
River Forest, Illinois